Billy Ocean is the debut studio album by the British recording artist Billy Ocean, released in 1976 by GTO Records. It includes the hit singles "Love Really Hurts Without You", "L.O.D. (Love on Delivery)" and "Stop Me (If You've Heard it All Before)". All three songs appeared in the UK Singles Chart in 1976.

Critical reception
Dave Thompson, in Reggae & Caribbean Music, wrote that the album "placed Ocean firmly in a disco-funk-lite vein." The New Rolling Stone Record Guide called the album's single, "Love Really Hurts Without You," "trite radio fodder."

Track listing
All tracks composed by Ben Findon and Leslie Charles; except where indicated
 "Tell Him to Move Over"
 "Stop Me (If You've Heard it All Before)" (Findon, Charles, Mike Myers)
 "Let's Put Our Emotions in Motion"
 "Let's Do it All Again" (Findon, Charles, Mike Myers)
 "Love Really Hurts Without You"
 "Whose Little Girl are You?"
 "Soul Rock" (Charles, Bob Puzey)
 "One Kiss Away"
 "Hungry for Love"
 "Eye of a Storm" (Findon, Geoff Wilkins)
 "L.O.D. (Love on Delivery)"

Arranged by Ben Findon, Billy Ocean and

References

Billy Ocean albums
1976 debut albums
Disco albums
Epic Records albums